Pho Chhu (Male River) is one of the major rivers of Bhutan, which tracks its source in the Gasa District that borders Bhutan with Tibet, which joins with Mo Chhu (Female River) at the confluence below Punakha Dzong, the winter resident of Dratshang Lhentshog. Upon Dang Chhu joining below Wangdue Dzong, the trio flows as Puna Tsang Chhu and finally empties in the Brahmaputra, upon being joined by several tributaries on its course in the valley of Assam. Its source is susceptible to glaciers which even destroyed a part of Punakha Dzong.

References 

Rivers of Bhutan